Minniver is a surname.

List of people with the surname

Fictional characters 

Maxine Minniver, from the British soap opera Hollyoaks
 Minnie Minniver, from the British soap opera Hollyoaks
 Mitzeee Minniver, from the British soap opera Hollyoaks
 Trish Minniver, from the British soap opera Hollyoaks

See also 

 Miniver
 Mrs. Miniver
 Mrs. Miniver (character)
 Mrs. Miniver (1960 film)
 Mrs. Miniver's problem

Surnames
Surnames of British Isles origin